Dudinka is a town in Krasnoyarsk Krai, Russia.

Dudinka may also refer to:
Dudinka Urban Settlement, a municipal formation which the district town of Dudinka in Taymyrsky Dolgano-Nenetsky District of Krasnoyarsk Krai, Russia is incorporated as
Dudinka (inhabited locality), several inhabited localities in Russia
Dudinka Airport (UROD), an airport in Krasnoyarsk Krai, Russia
Dudinka River, a river in Russia